Voivodeship Road 104 (abbreviated DW 104) is a route in the Polish voivodeship roads network. The route links the Voivodeship  Road 292 in Trzęsów with the Voivodeship Road 330 in Leszkowice. The road runs through two powiats: Polkowice County and Głogów County. The road has a length of 4 km.

Important settlements along the route

Leszkowice
Trzęsów

Route plan

References

104